John Trevanion (c. 1740–1810), was a British politician who sat in the House of Commons for 32 years between 1774 and 1806.
 
Trevanion was the son of Rev. Hugh Trevanion, vicar of West Alvington, Devon.  He became a London merchant, trading at 3 Bishopsgate Church Yard. In the middle of the eighteenth century, he took up residence at Dover. He married Elizabeth Boyd, daughter of Sir John Boyd, 1st Baronet, of Danson Park, Kent  on 5 June 1773.

Trevanion became interested in standing for Parliament for the Dover constituency and when he started to campaign he promised that if he were elected as Member of Parliament, he would build and maintain a free school for Dover boys. He fought for the seat of Dover in January 1770 but was defeated. A school, for fifty sons of Dover freemen, was nevertheless established in 1771. Trevanion was beaten decisively at a by-election of April 1773 but at the 1774 general election he was returned unopposed for Dover.

Trevanion retained the seat in the 1780 general election but when he stood in the 1784 general election, supported by North who was lord warden of the Cinque Ports, he was badly beaten. At a by-election of 1789 he regained the seat and held it until 1806 when he came third in the poll.

Trevanion died on 21 April 1810.

References

1810 deaths
British MPs 1774–1780
British MPs 1780–1784
British MPs 1784–1790
British MPs 1790–1796
Members of the Parliament of Great Britain for Dover
Year of birth uncertain